Badaro is a well-known residential neighborhood and business hub in the heart of Beirut. The neighborhood is roughly bounded by the Pierre Gemayel avenue on the north, the Hippodrome on the west, Sami el Solh avenue on the east, Beirut's pine forest on the southeast and the Tayyouneh roundabout on the south.
Badaro is the common name of Beirut's "Horsh" (park) administrative district which also includes three parks: a  pine forest known as Horsh Beirut, the Beirut Hippodrome and the Pine Residence, the French ambassador's residence.

Badaro, the "Village" of Beirut

Badaro is one of Beirut's most appealing neighborhoods, a lovely place with leafy streets to stroll during daytime, and recently became a nightlife destination. Badaro is within Beirut's green district, next to a  public park (the Beirut pine forest) and a  hippodrome. Opposite the museum, the tomb of the unknown soldier, as well as a Roman era colonnade, are part of a small garden with a Byzantine floor mosaic. Badaro is a neighborhood on a very human scale with small groceries around every corner, with a village feel. The neighborhood residents, a mix of impoverished Christian bourgeoisie, bohemian-style people in their 30s, and well-established urban professionals, are loyal to the local bakery and pastry shops. Because of the blossoming café and bar scene since early 2014, it has become a hip destination for Beirut's young and restless but old Beirutis remember that Badaro was already Beirut's version of the Village in the swinging sixties. Groceries and eateries can be found on almost every street of the area. You'll find dozens of restaurants, pubs, and sidewalk cafés of virtually every style. At many spots, you'll find affordable eats with the chance to enjoy your meal on the sidewalk. There are also some well-known upscale restaurants in the neighborhood. Badaro is also home to one of Beirut's nicest hotels, the Smallville Hotel, with its unique location next to the Beirut Museum and its stylish (design) interior.

The area around the museum square is Beirut's "Little Paris" as it includes most of Beirut's French facilities such as most of the Université Saint Joseph campuses, the French embassy and consulate, the Lycée Français and the Pine Residence, the French ambassador's residence, an outstanding 19th century palace known as "La residence des pins".

History

According to a widespread version, in the 17th century, the ruler of the Principality of Lebanon, Emir Fakhreddin,  planted pine trees to stop the advance of sand south of the city of Beirut in an area inhabited by Christians and Druze. In fact, much earlier chroniclers report a forest of pine trees stretching from the sea to the northern border of Badaro. In the 13th century, William of Tyre called the forest "La Pinée" or "Sapinoie". 
Today's residential neighborhood was planned after the end of World War I by French urban planner Michel Ecochard along the eastern border of Beirut Pine Forest. The main street of the Horsh district was named after Habib Badaro, a wealthy industrialist who had established his textile manufactures in the area. The neighborhood demographics were radically transformed in the 1960s when wealthy Syrian Christian families from Aleppo and Damascus fled their country, fearing Arabization and nationalization laws. Many of them settled in Badaro, which witnessed a boom in construction and the destruction of its pine trees forest. The neighborhood was nicknamed "Wakh Wakh" after a strange expression used by people from Aleppo and unknown to the Lebanese.

Most of the buildings were built on stilts in a typical low-rise post-modern architectural style. Some of the buildings were designed by mid-century famous architects, including French designer Jean Royere. During the Lebanese civil war of 1975–1990, Badaro was a frontline Christian neighborhood, therefore, resulting in the exodus of most of its inhabitants to Europe or safer parts of the country.

Nostalgia of the "dolce vita" style cosmopolitan life in Badaro in the 50s and the 60s is reflected in many books of famous French writer Richard Millet: " The Street of Badaro is an enchanted forest, every step reveals something buried (...)"

Schools and Churches

The greater Badaro area is home to many schools and churches from different denominations.
On Damascus street, facing the Smallville hotel lies the very pleasant Syriac Catholic patriarchate, a nice palace surrounded by a peaceful garden. Further on the same street, across the Museum of Beirut crossing and next to the French embassy, one can admire the Beirut's Greek Catholic Bishop's palace, which was fully destroyed during the 1975-1990 civil war and rebuilt with the same limestone architectural style. The Sacred Heart of Jesus Maronite church is a modern construction located northwest of Sami el Solh avenue, while another Maronite church, Notre Dame of Lourdes, is located across Sami el Solh, on the south east side and is mostly attended by worshippers from the neighboring Ain el Remmaneh Christian suburb.

On Badaro street, the famous Notre Dame des Anges Roman Catholic church has a very nice mosaic façade and is a reminiscence of the pre-civil war Lebanon, when Badaro was the preferred neighborhood of the many French nationals settled in Lebanon. Across Badaro street, one of the few Protestant churches in the country is attended mostly by the very small Lebanese Protestant  community. 
The Sunday mass of the beautiful Franciscan convent adjacent to the Hippodrome is attended by dozens of Ethiopian domestic women workers.  The scene with its chants and prayers in Amharic can be watched from the street and is quite fascinating, especially that these Tewahedo Orthodox  Ethiopian worshippers are fully covered by white veils.

The street adjacent to the Hippodrome is home to four schools:  College Louise Wegman un upscale secular secondary school, College Saint Sauveur which is associated with the Jesuit Jamhour college, the Syrian Catholic Lycée du Musée and the Franciscan school.
Across Sami el Solh, the semi tubular Notre Dame church of "College des Frères de la Salle" dominates the Avenue.

Economy
In addition to its dozens of cafes, bars,restaurants and urban design hotel The Smallville Hotel, the main attractions of Badaro are its two outstanding museums: the National Museum of Beirut and the Mineral Museum (MIM). Jogging or walking in the 75 acres pine forest also known as Horsh Beirut is also a must.
Badaro is one of Beirut's main business districts; Many corporate headquarters are located on Sami el Solh Avenue and, on the section of Pierre Gemayel avenue bordering the Badaro area, many high rise office towers were built after 2006, with some of the towers serving as headquarters to major banks. 
Moreover, Badaro is the very heart of Lebanon judicial and legal activity and is home to the Ministry of Justice, the Beirut Courts and  the vast majority of the country's law firms.

The neighborhood thrives on local residents, day-trippers, party animals, office and law firm employees and many expatriates. Thanks to the infrastructure works executed by the municipality of Beirut (sidewalks, roads, lighting) and the fact that many shops, cafes and bars are open until late in the night, Badaro has become, especially after 2014, one of Beirut's most secure districts. Unlike other areas of Beirut such as Gemmayzeh or Mar Mikhael, the rebirth of Badaro is not a process of "gentrification"; The area, since the middle of last century, is a middle to upper-class neighbourhood albeit discreet and quiet, reflecting its history and the fact that the Syrian Christian bourgeoisie's reputation for discretion contrasts with the Lebanese taste for ostentation.

At the Southwest end of Badaro, the military hospital sector is an enclave.  It regroups barracks, a hospital, pharmacies, shops and cooperatives, dedicated to members of the military and the police and their families, locals and tourists can also come and shop in these shops and cooperatives, tourists are also welcomed and helped.

These families of servicemen come from all regions of Lebanon and are generally poor. They benefit from free hospital and medical care and can shop in affordable outlets and cooperatives. While the presence of armed guards can seem daunting, one should not hesitate to enter the sector and discover a crowd completely different from that of the surrounding neighborhood.

Image gallery

See also
Beirut
National Museum of Beirut
Horsh Beirut

References

Streets in Beirut
Shopping districts and streets in Lebanon
Tourist attractions in Beirut
Retailing in Lebanon
Neighbourhoods of Beirut
Central business districts